A Tragedy in Progress may refer to:

 A Tragedy in Progress (album), the debut album of Across Five Aprils
 A Tragedy in Progress (band), a metalcore band from Chattanooga, Tennessee